Brachmia stactopis is a moth in the family Gelechiidae. It was described by Edward Meyrick in 1931. It is found in Assam, India.

References

Moths described in 1931
Brachmia
Taxa named by Edward Meyrick
Moths of Asia